Mphile Tsabedze (born 4 April 1985) is a Swaziland international footballer who plays as a midfielder. As of February 2010, he plays for Young Buffaloes in the Swazi Premier League and has won seven caps and scored one goal for his country.

External links

1985 births
Living people
Swazi footballers
Eswatini international footballers

Association footballers not categorized by position
Young Buffaloes F.C. players